Lou Anarumo (born August 18, 1966) is an American football coach who is the defensive coordinator for the Cincinnati Bengals of the National Football League (NFL). He previously served as the defensive backs coach at Purdue under Joe Tiller and Danny Hope from 2004 to 2011, the Miami Dolphins from 2012 to 2017, and the New York Giants in 2018.

Early years
Anarumo was born on Staten Island, New York in 1966. He attended Wagner College where he earned his degree in special education. While at Wagner, he served as the Junior Varsity head coach at Susan E. Wagner High School in Staten Island.

Coaching career

Early career
Anarumo served as the part-time running backs coach at Wagner in the spring of 1990 before he moved to the U.S. Merchant Marine Academy during the fall of 1990 to serve in the same capacity. From there, Anarumo went to Syracuse University where he served as a graduate assistant under Phil Elmassian working with the defensive backs. Anarumo then returned to the Merchant Marines as the defensive coordinator before being hired at Harvard to serve as the assistant head coach and defensive backs coach. It is at Harvard that Anarumo met former boss Joe Philbin, who at the time served as Harvard's offensive line coach. Anarumo made a stop at Marshall before being hired to replace Elmassian at Purdue.

Miami Dolphins
In 2012, Anarumo was hired by the Miami Dolphins as their defensive backs coach. On October 8, 2015, he was chosen to be the interim defensive coordinator of the Miami Dolphins to replace Kevin Coyle who was fired the same day. Due to the changes in coaching staff following the 2015–16 season, he was once again made the defensive backs coach under Adam Gase, the now head coach for the 2016–17 season.

New York Giants
On January 25, 2018, Anarumo was named as defensive backs coach for the New York Giants.

Cincinnati Bengals
On February 21, 2019, Anarumo was hired by the Cincinnati Bengals as their defensive coordinator under head coach Zac Taylor. He assumed Steve Jackson's cornerbacks coaching duties for the team's Week 11 and Week 12 games in 2020 against the Washington Football Team and New York Giants due to Jackson missing the games for COVID-19 pandemic protocols.

In the 2021–22 AFC Championship Game, Anarumo's defense held the Kansas City Chiefs to just a field goal in the second half and forced an interception in overtime, contributing to a 27–24 OT victory to advance to Super Bowl LVI. In Super Bowl LVI, the Bengals lost 23–20 to the Los Angeles Rams.

Personal life
Anarumo is married, and the couple have three children.

References

1966 births
Living people
Cincinnati Bengals coaches
Harvard Crimson football coaches
Marshall Thundering Herd football coaches
Merchant Marine Mariners football coaches
Miami Dolphins coaches
National Football League defensive coordinators
New York Giants coaches
Purdue Boilermakers football coaches
Sportspeople from Staten Island
Syracuse Orange football coaches
Wagner Seahawks football coaches